Calculating Infinity is the debut studio album by American metalcore band The Dillinger Escape Plan. Recorded at Trax East Recording Studio in South River, New Jersey, it was produced by engineer Steve Evetts with the band's guitarist Ben Weinman and drummer Chris Pennie, and released on September 28, 1999 by Relapse Records. The album is the band's only full-length album to feature original vocalist Dimitri Minakakis, who left the band in 2001.

Media response to Calculating Infinity was positive, with critics praising the aggressive nature of the album's material, as well as the complexity of the arrangement and instrumental work. Several publications have highlighted it as a landmark release in The Dillinger Escape Plan's catalogue and in hardcore punk and heavy metal as a whole. They also credited its influence on the genres and on the work of several subsequent bands. While exploring hardcore punk, the record is also classified as metalcore, experimental metal, and grindcore, in addition to being highlighted as one of the first mathcore albums. Its lyrical themes mostly revolve around failing relationships and insecurity. By 2013, Calculating Infinity had sold in excess of 100,000 copies worldwide.

Background 
In 1998 the band wrote and recorded an EP titled Under the Running Board. During this time period, The Dillinger Escape Plan gained notoriety in the hardcore punk scene for the intensity of their performances which were increasingly wild, and often violent. These features, as well as the creative, technical approach of their music led a record executive of Relapse Records to offer the band a multi-record contract. Shortly after the EP, rhythm guitarist John Fulton left the band to focus on his computer programming studies.

Recording and production
Recording for Calculating Infinity took place in March, April and June 1999 at Trax East Recording Studio in South River, New Jersey, with production led by Steve Evetts alongside the band's lead guitarist Ben Weinman and drummer Chris Pennie. The recording process has been described by Weinman as "extremely difficult" due to technological limitations, and resulted in an album with which he initially felt "very unhappy". In an interview with Decibel magazine, the guitarist added: "In the studio it was really hard, because at the time we didn't use Pro Tools and did everything to tape". The group also ran out of money during the process, resorting to trading their individual publishing rights for the songs to their label Relapse Records in return for $2,000 to complete the recording. Speaking about the decision, Weinman commented: "We weren't thinking about the future, just the present and how this record had to rule"; vocalist Dimitri Minakakis agreed: "We weren't focused on what the record could possibly do; we just wanted a record we were happy with", adding that it was a decision agreed by every member of the band.

The band's original bassist Adam Doll was unable to contribute to the recording of Calculating Infinity after suffering a spinal fracture in a road traffic accident shortly before recording began, forcing guitarist Ben Weinman to handle all guitar and bass duties. Speaking to Kerrang! about Doll's injury, Weinman described it as "a life-changing moment" for the band, adding: "It was difficult to think about moving forward, but I felt he would get better and I wanted to make something for him to come back to". Rhythm guitarist Brian Benoit joined the band partway through the recording process and contributed additional guitar recordings to a handful of tracks, as well as writing a guitar part on "Clip the Apex... Accept Instruction" and assisting with vocal arrangements on "Variations on a Cocktail Dress". When asked whether the band considered delaying the recording of the album until Benoit was "fully integrated" into the band, Weinman responded: "The idea was ... for us to progress and build on what we had done" rather than "stopping our progression waiting for someone else to catch up"; Benoit also commented: "I knew my role, which was getting up to par live".

Promotion and release
Calculating Infinity was released on September 28, 1999, with Relapse Records issuing it on CD and Hydra Head Records releasing a vinyl edition. The album was released later in Japan on April 5, 2000 featuring bonus tracks "The Mullet Burden", "Sandbox Magician" and "Abe the Cop", all of which were originally featured on the band's second extended play Under the Running Board in 1998. In promotion of the album, the band (with temporary bassist Jeff Wood) toured in support of American experimental rock group Mr. Bungle after receiving an invitation from their frontman Mike Patton, as well as appeared on the Warped Tour and at various festivals. Patton was reportedly introduced to the band after being given the album, however Weinman has clarified that the vocalist was familiar with the band prior to this and was "one of the first people to ever hear" the album in order to provide feedback. Calculating Infinity was reissued on vinyl alongside 2004's Miss Machine and 2007's Ire Works on November 27, 2015, marking the first time in more than ten years the album had been released on the format. The album reportedly sold in excess of 100,000 units worldwide, which made The Dillinger Escape Plan the highest-selling artist on Relapse at the time.

Composition and lyrics
Commentators have primarily categorised Calculating Infinity as mathcore due to its frequent use of complex time signatures, atypical rhythms and unpredictable tempo changes. Many have claimed that The Dillinger Escape Plan "pioneered" or even "created" the genre with the release of their debut album. Others have described the album's style as metalcore, experimental metal, hardcore punk, and grindcore. Speaking to The Independent, the band's guitarist Weinman suggested that the challenging nature of the album's material was intentional, explaining that "Calculating Infinity was us effectively ripping up the music theory book; if someone said 'don't harmonize with a second, it just sounds out of tune', then every single lead we did, we'd harmonize with a second. It sounded disgusting, but we did it". Natalie Zina Walschots of Exclaim! described the album's style as "even more avant-garde" than the band's first two extended plays, which she had noted featuring "complex and technical guitar work", "unpredictable shifts in tempo and tone" and "fractured song structures". Decibel writer Daniel Lake described the album as a combination of "gouts of noise, rhythmic chaos, jazzy runs and cinematic interludes".

According to vocalist Dimitri Minakakis, the majority of the lyrical content on Calculating Infinity is based on his experience in dysfunctional relationships. Speaking to Decibel magazine, Minakakis explained that "Most of my Dillinger lyrics were predicated on myself ... I just had stupid relationships with idiotic people, and I'd just write a song about it", concluding that "most of the lyrics on Calculating Infinity were based on human insecurity. That's where I got the best material." The album's title was suggested by guitarist Brian Benoit, who recalled to Decibel: "Since so much of the material lyrically was about failing relationships, I kind of took it as a "love not lasting forever" sort of thing ... Obviously, forever – or infinity – isn't going to happen ... so let's see how long we can calculate before this blows up in our face."

Reception and legacy

Media response to Calculating Infinity was positive. AllMusic writer Jason Hundey described that the album "spews forth anger and venomous misery in a way that is comparable only to spontaneous combustion", adding that it expands upon "the ultra-aggressive, deliciously technical approach they adopt toward grind and hardcore". Hundey praised the release for being "both screechingly abrasive ... and morbidly beautiful", dubbing it "explosive and brilliant" and highlighting the tracks "43% Burnt" and "Weekend Sex Change". Decibel magazine's Kevin Stewart-Panko wrote: "Regardless of what you think about Calculating Infinity, you can't deny that the 11 tracks on this album revolutionized extreme music and raised the bar in terms of technicality, musicianship, speed, dynamics," describing it as a "groundbreaking metallic hardcore album". The CMJ New Music Report noted that "this noisy album is almost painful to listen to, but it's compelling enough to turn you into a happy masochist." Terrorizer magazine ranked the album as the 15th best release of the year, while Metal Hammer also included it in a retrospective top ten list for 1999 published in 2017.

Calculating Infinity has since been lauded as a landmark release for the band and the genre. Rolling Stone ranked it the 56th greatest metal album of all-time in a 2017 feature, praising the release for featuring "an underlying logic, [and] a sense of structure that lifted songs ... to a realm above the noise and fury of everyday hardcore". Metal Hammer columnist Stephen Hill claimed that the album "changed the face of metal" and demonstrated that the members of the band were "serious and inventive musicians, not just one dimensional noisemongers". Writing for MetalSucks, Amy Sciaretto suggested that Calculating Infinity was the album "that made Dillinger so revered by the metal underground, and obviously, those listening to metal", while Alternative Press writer Colin McGuire described the album as "one of the most influential collections of experimental metal the genre has seen in the last two decades". Metal Injection ranked Calculating Infinity as the sixth best debut album in heavy metal in a 2016 feature, while Loudwire included the album at number ten on a similar list, with writer Graham Hartmann hailing it as "the most spastic, mathematical, chaotic and contradicting metal album ever released". Loudwire later listed the record third on their list of "25 Best Metalcore albums of all-time".

Track listing
Credits adapted from the liner notes of Calculating Infinity. Songwriting credits were not printed in the album's sleeve but they can be obtained through an ASCAP database search.

Track 11, "Variations on a Cocktail Dress" ends at 2:15, then three minutes of silence follow along with a hidden track with samples from the 1959 film The Diary of Anne Frank.

Personnel
Credits adapted from the liner notes of Calculating Infinity.

The Dillinger Escape Plan
Dimitri Minakakis – vocals
Ben Weinman – guitar, bass
Brian Benoit – guitar
Chris Pennie – drums, keyboards

Production
Ben Weinman – production
Chris Pennie – production
Steve Evetts – production, engineering
Aaron Harris – engineering assistance
Jason Hellmann – engineering assistance
Alan Douches – mastering
Adam Peterson – graphic design
Paul Delia – photography
Scott Kinkade – additional photography

References

External links

1999 debut albums
The Dillinger Escape Plan albums
Relapse Records albums
Hydra Head Records albums
Albums produced by Steve Evetts